Michael McHenry (born September 30, 1974) is an American songwriter, record producer, and multi-instrumentalist, best known for his work with The Black Eyed Peas, Chris Brown and Miley Cyrus. Michael McHenry's songs are represented by Downtown Music Publishing.

Biography
Michael McHenry has co-written songs for both will.i.am and The Black Eyed Peas. In addition, he has co-written songs for Chris Brown, Kevin Michael, Kid Cudi, Kid Sister, Rihanna, Crookers, Madonna, Kelis and Miley Cyrus. He currently resides in Los Angeles, California.

Songwriting and production credits

Awards and nominations
ASCAP Pop Music Awards
2014-Citation of Achievement (Don't Wake Me Up) (Won)

References

External links
 Profile from Downtown Music Publishing
 Michael (Mike) McHenry credits on Discogs
 Michael (Mike) McHenry credits on AllMusic

1974 births
Living people
Record producers from Illinois
Songwriters from Illinois